The Comrads is a self-titled debut studio album by American West Coast hip hop duo The Comrads. It was released on July 8, 1997 via Street Life Records. Production was handled by "Big Jessie" Willard, Young Tre, Bub, Binky Mack, Ant Banks and the Comrads' Terrell "Gangsta" Anderson. It features guest appearances from Westside Connection and AllFrumTha I. The album peaked at #113 on the Billboard 200 albums chart in the United States. Its single "Homeboyz" was also charted on the Billboard charts.

Track listing

Charts

References

External links 

1997 debut albums
The Comrads albums
Albums produced by Ant Banks